Ieva Adomavičiūtė (born 3 December 1994) is a Lithuanian national representative rower. She won the women's double scull title alongside Milda Valčiukaitė at the 2018 World Rowing Championships in Plovdiv. She was four-times an underage world champion (twice junior, twice under 23). She studied at Washington State University.

References 

Lithuanian female rowers
1994 births
Living people
European Rowing Championships medalists
World Rowing Championships medalists for Lithuania